The 1913 Western State Normal Hilltoppers football team represented Western State Normal School (later renamed Western Michigan University) as an independent during the 1913 college football season.  In their seventh season under head coach William H. Spaulding, the Hilltoppers compiled a 4–0 record and outscored their opponents, 59 to 15. End Graham Barker was the team captain.

Schedule

References

Western State Normal Hilltoppers
Western Michigan Broncos football seasons
Western State Normal Hilltoppers football